Alexandros Makriyannis is a professor in the Department of Medicinal Chemistry at Northeastern University, where his research group has synthesized many new compounds with cannabinoid activity. Some of those are:

See also
 List of CP cannabinoids
 List of JWH cannabinoids
 List of HU cannabinoids
 List of miscellaneous designer cannabinoids

References